Budaung may refer to several places in Burma:

 Budaung, Bhamo
Budaung, Banmauk